H. S. Sudhindra (born 1968) is an Indian Classical percussionist (Mridangam).

Early life and background
Vidwan Sri H.S. Sudhindra has been under the tutelage of gurus: Vidwan Sri. M. Vasudeva Rao and Vidwan Sri. Srimushnam V. Raja Rao; both exponents of the art of playing mridangam who are widely respected both as performers and teachers. Born on 20 November 1968, he started to perform at the age of thirteen and has never looked back. He passed his Vidwat exam conducted by the Government of Karnataka and secured the first rank.

Career
He is an 'A-Top' graded artist and performs for All India Radio, Doordarshan, and other broadcasting channels. His strict adherence to tradition, aesthetic sense, innovative approach, and adaptability to different styles of music has received acclaim from musicians, connoisseurs, laymen and the media alike. He is deeply devoted and committed to the field of music.

Apart performing as a percussionist in Bangalore, he has been performing regularly during the December season at Chennai since 1994. He has also performed all over the globe, including in the Cleveland Tyagaraja Festival. He is the recipient of numerous awards and titles, and has published papers and given a number of lecture demonstrations on topics related to percussion in Carnatic Music.

He is the founder trustee and principal of Suswaralaya College Of Music. Through this institution, Vidwan Sri H.S. Sudhindra is rendering a great service to the cause of music.

He has accompanied many artists of Carnatic Music.

Disciples
Vidwan H S Sudhindra has trained many percussion artists who are now performing artists.

References

External links 

1968 births
Living people
Musicians from Bangalore
Indian percussionists
Mridangam players
20th-century Indian musicians
20th-century drummers